Tileh Kuh (also Romanized as Tīleh Kūh; also known as Nīleh Kūh) is a village in Howmeh Rural District, in the Central District of Behbahan County, Khuzestan Province, Iran. At the 2006 census, its population was 143, in 29 families.

References 

Populated places in Behbahan County